Guo Shengkun (born 16 October 1954) is a retired Chinese politician and business executive. He was the Secretary of the Central Political and Legal Affairs Commission of the Chinese Communist Party, a member of the CCP Politburo, and a secretary of the CCP Secretariat, between 2017 and 2022. Previously Guo served as Minister of Public Security, State Councilor, Communist Party secretary of Guangxi Zhuang Autonomous Region and General Manager of Aluminum Corporation of China, a major state-owned enterprise.

Guo is a native of Xingguo County, Jiangxi province.  He has a doctoral degree in Business Administration from  the University of Science and Technology Beijing.

Career

Metal industry 
Guo Shengkun entered the workforce in 1973 during the Cultural Revolution as a sent-down youth in rural Jiangxi province, and joined the CCP in December 1974. From 1977 to 1979 he studied mining at the Jiangxi Institute of Metallurgy (now Jiangxi University of Science and Technology).

Starting in 1979 Guo worked in the non-ferrous metal industry in Jiangxi, rising through the ranks of China Non-Ferrous Metal Mining Corporation.  In 2000 he led the creation of the state-owned enterprise Aluminum Corporation of China (Chinalco) and became the General Manager of the company.  He also oversaw the dual listings of Chinalco's subsidiary, Aluminum Corporation of China Limited (Chalco), on the New York and Hong Kong stock exchanges.

Politics

Guangxi 
After more than two decades in the metal industry, in 2004 Guo was transferred to the government of Guangxi Zhuang Autonomous Region, becoming the deputy party chief and deputy chairman of the provincial-level region which is rich non-ferrous metal reserves.  In November 2007 he succeeded Liu Qibao, who was transferred to Sichuan province, as the Communist Party Chief of Guangxi. He held the position until December 2012, when he was succeeded by Peng Qinghua.

Minister of Public Security 
In December 2012 Guo was transferred to the national government to succeed Meng Jianzhu as the Minister of Public Security, China's top policeman.  Some political analysts questioned his suitability for the post as he had minimal legal experience. On 16 March 2013 Guo was appointed one of the five State Councilors in China.

Guo Shengkun was an alternate member of the 16th and the 17th Central Committees, and a full member of the 18th Central Committee. He is a member of the 19th Politburo of the CCP.

Central Political and Legal Affairs Commission
In October 2017, Guo is appointed as the Secretary of the Central Political and Legal Affairs Commission of the CCP.

References 

|-

Living people
1954 births
Members of the 19th Politburo of the Chinese Communist Party
Political office-holders in Guangxi
Chinese Communist Party politicians from Jiangxi
People's Republic of China politicians from Jiangxi
Ministers of Public Security of the People's Republic of China
Politicians from Ganzhou
People from Xingguo County
Businesspeople from Jiangxi
State councillors of China